Luciano Gastón Perdomo (born 10 September 1996) is an Argentine footballer who plays for Chacarita Juniors as a midfielder.

Career
In August 2017, Perdomo was tested positive for doping for a game in the previous season on 27 May 2017 against Colón. He was tested positive for cannabis and was suspended for one year on 27 December 2017.

On 29 January 2019, Perodmo joined Aldosivi on a contract until June 2020. Six months later, he joined Chacarita Juniors.

References

External links

1996 births
Living people
Association football midfielders
Argentine footballers
Club de Gimnasia y Esgrima La Plata footballers
Aldosivi footballers
Chacarita Juniors footballers
Argentine Primera División players
Primera Nacional players